Cheri Jahn (born July 12, 1953) is a politician from Colorado. She served in both the State Senate and the State House of Representatives. While serving in the senate, she switched her party from Democrat to Independent In the Colorado Senate, she represented the 20th district from 2011 until 2019. Her district encompassed the city of Wheat Ridge, Colorado. Previously she was a member of the Colorado House of Representatives from 2001 through 2008.

Jahn was elected to the State House in 2000, where she represented Wheat Ridge.  She was sworn into her first term in the State Senate in 2011. On December 29, 2017, Jahn announced on Facebook she was switching her political affiliation from Democratic to unaffiliated.

In the 2011 session of the Colorado General Assembly, Jahn Vice-chaired the Agricultural & Natural Resources Committee, and  a member of the Finance and the Business, Labor and Technology Committees.

Education
Jahn obtained her Paralegal Degree from the Community College of Denver in 2003.

Professional experience
Jahn was the owner of Colorado Housekeeping Services.

Organizations
Jahn has been a part of a number of organizations which include:
Co-chair, Jefferson County Schools District Accountability Committee
Member, Stevens Elementary, Parent Teacher Association
Member, Everitt Middle School, Accountability Committee, 
Volunteer, High School Accountability Committee
Volunteer, Victim Advocates Services

Family
Jahn is single but has three children and together they live in Wheat Ridge, Colorado.

References

External links

1952 births
Living people
Colorado Democrats
Colorado Independents
Colorado state senators
Members of the Colorado House of Representatives
People from Sterling, Colorado
Women state legislators in Colorado
21st-century American politicians
21st-century American women politicians